The Linnet class were a class of three small coastal minelayers commissioned into the Royal Navy just before the Second World War.

Description
The Linnet class were the largest of a dozen specialized vessels known as "Indicator Loop Mine Layers" built for the Royal Navy immediately before and during the Second World War. These vessels were designed to lay controlled mines, used in coastal defences, as well as anti-submarine indicator loops. Similar vessels known as mine planters were operated by the US Army during the same era.

They were equipped with a single 20 mm gun and two machine guns. There was a complement of 24 officers and crew and a total mine capacity of 12.

Ships

Notes

References
 Jane's Fighting Ships 1939, p. 98
 

 
Mine warfare vessel classes
Ship classes of the Royal Navy